Schempp may refer to:

Ellery Schempp (born 1940), physicist noted for being the primary student involved in the Abington School District v. Schempp case
Martin Schempp (1905–1984), German glider pilot and founder of Schempp-Hirth, a major manufacturer of gliders
Simon Schempp (born 1988), German biathlete
Theodore Schempp (1904–1988), American artist and art dealer

See also
Abington School District v. Schempp, 374 U.S. 203 (1963), United States Supreme Court case
Schempp-Hirth, glider manufacturer based in Kirchheim unter Teck, Germany